Spencer Robert Strider (born October 28, 1998) is an American professional baseball pitcher for the Atlanta Braves of Major League Baseball (MLB). He played college baseball for the Clemson Tigers, and was drafted by the Atlanta Braves in the fourth round of the 2020 Major League Baseball Draft. He made his MLB debut in 2021.

Amateur career
Strider attended the Christian Academy of Knoxville in Knoxville, Tennessee. He was drafted by the Cleveland Indians in the 35th round of the 2017 Major League Baseball draft, but did not sign and played college baseball at Clemson University for the Clemson Tigers. In 2018, he played collegiate summer baseball with the Falmouth Commodores of the Cape Cod Baseball League. Strider missed the 2019 season after suffering a torn UCL which required Tommy John surgery. He returned from the injury in 2020 and was drafted by the Atlanta Braves in the fourth round of the 2020 Major League Baseball Draft and signed.

Professional career
Strider split his professional debut of 2021 between the Augusta GreenJackets, the Rome Braves, the Mississippi Braves, and the Gwinnett Stripers. Between the four stops he posted a 3–7 record with a 2.64 ERA and 153 strikeouts over 94 innings. 

On October 1, 2021, Strider was selected to the Atlanta active roster. He made his major league debut that night, pitching one inning of relief against the New York Mets. Strider earned his first career win on the final day of the season, again facing the Mets in relief. The Braves finished with an 88–73 record, clinching the NL East, and eventually won the 2021 World Series, giving the Braves their first title since 1995.

Strider began the 2022 season on the Braves' Opening Day roster. He began the season in the bullpen and was moved to the starting rotation from May 30 onwards. Strider was named National League Rookie of the Month for July. On September 1, he broke the Braves' record for most strikeouts in a nine-inning game, fanning 16 Colorado Rockies batters in eight shutout innings. On September 18, Strider became the fastest pitcher in either the American League or National League to throw 200 strikeouts in a single season, reaching the milestone in 130 innings pitched. He was also the first rookie in the franchise's modern-era history to strike out 200 batters in a single season. The feat had been accomplished by Bill Stemmyer and Kid Nichols in 1886 and 1890, respectively, while the franchise was known as the Boston Beaneaters. Strider made his final appearance of the 2022 regular season on September 18, and was placed on the 15-day injured list due to an oblique injury on September 24. On October 10, 2022, the Braves and Strider agreed to a 6-year, $75M extension through the 2029 season. For the 2022 regular season, he was 11–5 with a 2.67 ERA, in 31 games (20 starts). Strider recovered from his injury for the 2022 postseason and was placed on the National League Division Series roster, being named the starter in Game 3 versus the Philadelphia Phillies. Strider struggled, pitching just 2.1 innings and earning the loss in a 9–1 defeat; the Phillies would eliminate the Braves in four games. At the end of the season, Strider finished second in the National League Rookie of the Year Award balloting to teammate Michael Harris II.

Pitching style
During the 2018 college baseball season, Strider's repertoire included a two-seam fastball, a slurve-like pitch, and a changeup he did not use often. After recovering from Tommy John surgery, Strider began throwing a four-seam fastball, and became more willing to pitch in the upper region of the strike zone.

Personal life
Strider has followed a vegan diet since 2019, crediting it in part for helping with his high blood pressure. Before tournaments, Strider's high school teammates grew facial hair and dyed their hair blond as a bonding exercise. He maintained a mustache during his collegiate baseball career at Clemson, where he became known as "The Mustache Man." In high school, Strider wore uniform number 28. Because that number was assigned to Clemson teammate Seth Beer, Strider wore 29 while playing for the Tigers. As the Braves had retired 29 for pitcher John Smoltz, and 28 was assigned to Matt Olson, Strider wore 65 during his rookie season, then subsequently chose 99 to commemorate Rick Vaughn, a character in the 1989 film Major League.

Before the 2023 season began Strider married Maggie, whom he had first met in high school.

References

External links

Clemson Tigers bio

1998 births
Living people
Atlanta Braves players 
Augusta GreenJackets players
Baseball players from Columbus, Ohio
Clemson Tigers baseball players
Falmouth Commodores players
Gwinnett Stripers players
Major League Baseball pitchers
Mississippi Braves players
Rome Braves players